The Mahitahi River is a river of the southwest of New Zealand's South Island. It flows northwest from the Hooker Range, part of the Southern Alps, reaching the Tasman Sea at Bruce Bay.

See also
List of rivers of New Zealand

References

Rivers of the West Coast, New Zealand
Rivers of New Zealand
Westland District